The National Council of State Boards of Nursing (NCSBN) is a US not-for-profit organization whose membership comprises the boards of nursing in the 50 states, the District of Columbia, and four US territories — American Samoa, Guam, Northern Mariana Islands and the Virgin Islands. There are also 30 associate members.

See also 

 NCLEX-RN
 NCLEX-PN
 Nursing
 Nursing in the United States
 Nurse licensure

References

 
Nursing organizations in the United States
Medical and health professional associations in Chicago